From Dark to Light is the second mixtape by American rapper NLE Choppa. It was released through NLE Choppa Entertainment under license to Warner Records on November 1st. The mixtape was announced in October 2020 as Choppa explains the release date, cover art, and songs for the mixtape in an interview. It features guest appearances from Big Sean and Ink. The song "Bryson", which is named after his first name, was released as the mixtape's lead single, along with the music video. The mixtape's lyrical content is focused on meditation, affirmations, and positivity, a notable change from NLE Choppa's previous work.

Critical reception

Fred Thomas of AllMusic said, "Guns, violence, and street life were constant themes in Choppa's music, but mixtape From Dark to Light takes an unexpected turn towards positivity and enlightenment."

Track listing
Credits adapted from Tidal.

Charts

References

2020 mixtape albums
Warner Records albums
NLE Choppa albums